Powell is an unincorporated community located in the town of Sherman, Iron County, Wisconsin, United States.

History
A post office called Powell was established in 1908, and remained in operation until it was discontinued in 1942. The community was named for John Wesley Powell, an American geologist and explorer.

References

Unincorporated communities in Iron County, Wisconsin
Unincorporated communities in Wisconsin